Siam Rath (lit.: 'Siamese State') is a Thai newspaper founded on 25 June 1950. It was one of the most politically influential newspapers during the latter half of the twentieth century, and was closely associated with former prime minister Kukrit Pramoj, who was the newspaper's co-founder and, for various periods, its owner, director, editor, and columnist. The newspaper positions itself as a "quality" paper, like the more widely circulated Matichon. Following Kukrit's death in 1995, the paper was sold to Chatchawal Kong-udom.

References

External links

Newspapers published in Thailand
Thai-language newspapers
Thai news websites
1950 establishments in Thailand
Publications established in 1950